Andrey Loginov (born 3 March 1972 in Tiraspol, Moldovan SSR) is a Russian former middle distance runner who specialized in the 800 and 1500 metres.

International competitions

References

1972 births
Living people
People from Tiraspol
Soviet male middle-distance runners
Russian male middle-distance runners
Olympic male middle-distance runners
Olympic athletes of Russia
Athletes (track and field) at the 1996 Summer Olympics
Goodwill Games medalists in athletics
Competitors at the 1994 Goodwill Games
World Athletics Championships athletes for Russia
European Athletics Indoor Championships winners
Russian Athletics Championships winners